The Lions at the Dvortsovaya pier are two lion sculptures in bronze placed at the Admiralty embankment in Saint Petersburg since 1832. The lions are copies of the late 16th century Italian Medici lions in Florence.

The lions are the best known among several Medici lions and other lion sculptures in Saint Petersburg. The sculptures were created by the German craftsman, Johan Gottlieb Prang to designs by sculptor Ivan Prokofiev.

References
saint-petersburg.com

External links

Outdoor sculptures in Russia
Animal sculptures in Russia
Sculptures of lions
19th-century sculptures
Bronze sculptures in Russia
Tourist attractions in Saint Petersburg